Việt Báo may refer to:

 Việt Báo (Canada), a weekly newspaper in Montreal
 Việt Báo Daily News, a daily newspaper in Garden Grove, California
 Việt Báo (Vietnam), an online newspaper in Vietnam
 Hoa Thịnh Đốn Việt Báo, a weekly newspaper in Annandale, Virginia